Amari was an R&B group who were signed to Tommy Boy Records in the 1990s featuring members Sneezy, Sheri and Pooh. Amari released their debut album Sunshine on July 21, 1998. Their debut single "Callin'" was released in 1998, it was featured on the Ride soundtrack, Billboard  magazine noted the track as one of the years "New & Northworthy" tracks, eventually peaking on the R&B charts. Amari placed the song "Get Down With Me" on the Nothing to Lose soundtrack.

References

American contemporary R&B musical groups
Living people
Year of birth missing (living people)